Lecomtella is a genus of grasses with the sole species Lecomtella madagascariensis, native to Madagascar. It is the only genus in the tribe Lecomtelleae.

The species and genus were described by Aimée Antoinette Camus in 1925. Contrarily to many other species in subfamily Panicoideae, this grass uses C3 photosynthesis.

The genus is included in the tribe Paspaleae in a 2015 classification although a phylogenetic study had shown in 2013 that it is isolated within the subfamily Panicoideae and best treated in a separate tribe Lecomtelleae.

References

External links

Panicoideae
Endemic flora of Madagascar
Monotypic Poaceae genera
Taxa named by Aimée Antoinette Camus